Harold Wood (18 January 1889 – 25 January 1954) was a British weightlifter. He competed at the 1924 Summer Olympics and the 1928 Summer Olympics.

References

External links
 

1889 births
1954 deaths
British male weightlifters
Olympic weightlifters of Great Britain
Weightlifters at the 1924 Summer Olympics
Weightlifters at the 1928 Summer Olympics
Place of birth missing
20th-century British people